These are the results of the Men's triple jump event at the 2001 World Championships in Athletics in Edmonton, Alberta, Canada.

In the first round, Walter Davis took the lead with a 17.20m.  Now 35 years old, world record holder and 1995 champion Jonathan Edwards lurked in second place with a 16.84m.  Early in the second round Yoel García moved into the lead with a 17.40m.  Christian Olsson moved into second with a 17.28m.  With his next jump, Olsson took the lead with a 17.47m.  The next jumper on the runway was Edwards.  His masters world record  was more than a foot further than all but one of these jumpers had ever achieved.  In the fifth round, Igor Spasovkhodskiy, who was only 7th at the end of the preliminary jumps, leapfrogged past Garcia with a 26 cm improvement in his personal best, 17.44m to take the bronze.

Medalists

Schedule
All times are Mountain Standard Time (UTC-7)

Results

Qualification
Qualification: Qualifying Performance 17.10 (Q) or at least 12 best performers (q) advance to the final.

Final

References
Results
IAAF

Triple Jump
Triple jump at the World Athletics Championships